The 1933 UK & Ireland Greyhound Racing Year was the eighth year of greyhound racing in the United Kingdom and Ireland.

Roll of honour

Summary
The industry continued to experience a boom with attendances steadily increasing. However the totalisator ban enforced by the government was impacting profits with 17,000 jobs affected. The situation did not deter new tracks opening, with at least 28 known tracks starting racing during 1933. Future Cutlet won the 1933 English Greyhound Derby before being retired, his owner Mr Evershed set up a trust fund for the champion so that he would live in luxury for the rest of his life.

Tracks
London remained the main focus point for racing with Walthamstow Stadium, New Cross Stadium, Wandsworth Stadium and Stamford Bridge joining the tracks already operating. A small flapping track (independent) called the Crooked Billet Greyhound & Whippet track was bought by William Chandler who then went about building Walthamstow. Wandsworth stadium cost £100,000 to build and seated 20,000 and New Cross could accommodate 25,000 people but was only an independent track at this stage. Stamford Bridge was capable of holding 100,000 spectators and was home to Chelsea F.C.; the Greyhound Racing Association (GRA) controlled the Stamford Bridge racing with the track's supply of runners coming from the GRA kennels at the Hook Estate in Northaw.

The availability of a venue for greyhound racing did not seem to be a problem and included Thorpe Greyhound Track (an ice skating rink in the winter) and Derby Greyhound Stadium (a former prison).

Tracks opened

News
Nine famous greyhounds from the GRA kennels, at Northaw, appeared at Selfridges in Oxford Street which attracted 10,000 visitors.

Competitions
The newly inaugurated Gold Collar at Catford Stadium offered £1,000 prize money, a substantial amount only surpassed by the English Greyhound Derby itself. The Derby champion Wild Woolley back with Jack Rimmer, added this new event to his successes. A second major event was introduced in Scotland at Powderhall Stadium called the Edinburgh Cup.

Beef Cutlet easily defeated his rivals during the Welsh Greyhound Derby final at White City Stadium, Cardiff in a time of 29.56 seconds, before Long Hop failed to defend his Grand National title, following a short head defeat to Scapegoat. Three weeks after the Derby, Beef Cutlet surprisingly lost to Elsell in the Cesarewitch final but made amends in the Record Stakes at Wimbledon winning the race against four of the best dogs in training, Future Cutlet, Goofy Gear, Brave Enough and Failing.

A new star called Creamery Border came to prominence when winning the Scurry Gold Cup, he was put with Arthur 'Doc' Callanan who was now a trainer at Wembley and had nursed the dog back to health in 1931. This was his first track event in England and went unbeaten throughout the competition. Winning his heat and semi-final, he went on to win the final by six lengths in a track record time, from Chesterfield Jewel, with the Oaks winner Queen of the Suir behind them. The Laurels went to Wild Woolley, trained by Jimmy Campbell once again; Queen of the Suir made the Laurels final before successfully defending her Oaks title for trainer Stanley Biss one month later. Creamery Border went lame and failed to finish in the semi-finals of the Laurels.

Ireland
In Ireland the owners of Harold's Cross Stadium were left angered when Shelbourne Park was once again handed the Irish Greyhound Derby. Mr Tynan representing the track had pointed out that the previous year Paddy O'Donoghue had promised that they could hold the event in 1933. Irish Coursing Club chairman John Bruton explained that they could not cancel a ruling by the club that had already made. Tynan stormed out of a meeting with Harold's Cross refusing to run any classic competitions or their qualifying races and threatened to run their own Irish Championship.

Brilliant Bob, a May 1931 whelp, by Other Days out of Birchfield Bessie was bred in County Tipperary by Billy Quinn, and he sold a half share to an Irish farmer. The dog came into prominence as a puppy, when he won Ireland's oldest coursing event, the Tipperary Cup. When he was introduced to track racing the brindle-fawn dog finished runner-up in the Easter Cup and then won the St Leger at Clonmel Greyhound Stadium over 550 yards in 31.53.

Principal UK races

Key
U = unplaced
+ = Track Record

References 

Greyhound racing in the United Kingdom
Greyhound racing in the Republic of Ireland
1933 in British sport
1933 in Irish sport
1933 in Welsh sport
1933 in Scottish sport